Cofman is a surname. Notable people with the surname include:

Judita Cofman (1936–2001), Yugoslav-German mathematician
Tamara Cofman Wittes (born Tamara Cofman in 1969), American writer and public figure

See also
 Coffman